Mordecai Hirsch Bauman (March 12, 1912 in the Bronx – May 16, 2007 in Manhattan) was an American baritone.

Biography
Bauman was born on March 2, 1912, to Allen and Minnie Bauman in the Bronx, New York City. He attended James Monroe High School, then was granted a fellowship to the Juilliard Graduate School of Music during his freshman year at Columbia College in 1930, making him the first and only student to attend both institutions concurrently. He studied voice with Francis Rogers at Juilliard.

During the 1930's he became active in the communist political movement within the United States, and made several recordings with a group under the name "The New Singers" where they recorded English language versions of well known communist songs.

He married Irma Commanday. Together, they started the Indian Hill Art Workshop in Stockbridge, Massachusetts. Indian Hill was the first summer school in the arts for high school students. It was open until 1978.

During the Bach Tercentenary in 1985, he led a tour to the Bach Festival in Leipzig. A few years later, he completed a documentary, "The Stations of Bach", in East Germany. The documentary was funded by the National Endowments for the Arts and Humanities and broadcast nationally on PBS in 1990. CUNY TV now owns the documentary and broadcasts it annually on Bach's birthday, March 21.

In 2006, Mordecai and Irma published their memoir, titled, From our Angle of Repose. He died in 2007 at the age of 95.

References

External links
Mordecai Bauman papers in the Music Division of the New York Public Library for the Performing Arts
Indian Hill Music Workshop Records at Stockbridge Library, Museum & Archives
Jamée Ard, "A Passion for Music" (Juilliard alumni spotlight on Bauman)
Photographs from Bach Tercentenary tour led by Bauman
Indian Hill Arts Workshop

1912 births
2007 deaths
Jewish American classical musicians
American operatic baritones
People from the Bronx
Singers from New York City
Juilliard School alumni
Columbia College (New York) alumni
20th-century American male opera singers
Classical musicians from New York (state)
James Monroe High School (New York City) alumni
20th-century American Jews